Nishigandha Wad is an Indian Marathi film actress, social scientist, and author.

Biography
She received her doctorate from the University of Mumbai with a dissertation on Changing Role of Women In Society — Reflections from Marathi & British Theatres (1970–1990).

Filmography

Partial list of Marathi films

 Shejari Shejari (1990)
 Eka Peksha Ek (1991)
 Bandhan (1991)
 Pratikar (1991)
 Bala Jo Jo Re (1993)
 Premankur (1993)
 Saasar Maaher (1994)
 Janmadata (1994)
 Ashi hi Dyaneshwari (2001)
 Sata Lota Pan Sagla Khota (2014)
Prem Kahani EK Lapleli Ghoshta (2016)

Partial list of Hindi films

 Salim Langde Pe Mat Ro (1990)
 Karm Yodha (1992)
 Daadagiri (1997)
 Deewangee (2002)
 Tumko Na Bhool Paayenge (2002)
 Aap Mujhe Achche Lagne Lage (2002)
 Indian Babu (2003)
 Shaapit
 Wazir as Ruhana's Mother (2016)
 Race 3 as Audrey (2017)
 Gajmoti

Television roles
 Aavhan as Veena
 Sasural Simar Ka as Sujata Rajendra Bharadwaj (2011–16)
 Savitri Devi College & Hospital as Savitri Anand Malhotra (2017–18)
 Akhir Kaun (Aired on Doordarshan, Episodes 10,11,12,18,19,20)
 Meri Gudiya as Avi's grandmother (December 2019)
 Dastaan as Nishi
 Peetcha Karo as Sarita on Doordarshan
 Jay Bhawani Jay Shivaji as Jijabai

References

External links
 
 

1969 births
Living people
Indian film actresses
Indian television actresses
Indian soap opera actresses
Actresses in Hindi cinema
Actresses in Hindi television
Actresses in Marathi cinema
Actresses in Marathi television
Marathi actors
University of Mumbai alumni
Indian social sciences writers
20th-century Indian non-fiction writers
Indian art writers
Indian women non-fiction writers
20th-century women writers
20th-century Indian actresses
21st-century Indian actresses